The National Disaster Medical System (NDMS) is a federally coordinated healthcare system and partnership of the United States Departments of Health and Human Services (HHS), Homeland Security (DHS), Defense (DOD), and Veterans Affairs (VA). The purpose of the NDMS is to support State, local, Tribal and Territorial authorities following disasters and emergencies by supplementing health and medical systems and response capabilities. NDMS would also support the military and the Department of Veterans Affairs health care systems in caring for combat casualties, should requirements exceed their capacity.

The Department of Health and Human Services, Assistant Secretary for Preparedness and Response (ASPR), in its role as Coordinator of Emergency Support Function#8 (ESF-8), Public Health and Medical Services, of the National Response Framework (NRF), employs the NDMS to provide patient care, patient movement, and definitive care, as well as veterinary services, and fatality management support when requested by authorities from States, localities, Tribes and Territories, or other federal departments. Some common missions for NDMS include: augmenting a hospital in a disaster area to decompress the overtaxed emergency department; providing veterinary services to federal working animals during National Security Special Events, such as the Presidential Inauguration; and, supporting the National Transportation Safety Board and affected localities with fatality management services following major transportation disasters. Although NDMS is primarily a domestic disaster response capability, NDMS teams and personnel have also responded to disasters internationally, such as in Iran and Haiti following devastating earthquakes.

The NDMS was founded in 1984.

Organization
NDMS has three major components:
 Emergency medical response by medical teams made up by Federal Intermittent Employees (IFEs) (civilians who are federalized when activated), equipment, and supplies deployed to a disaster area when requested by State or local authorities
 Movement of ill and injured patients from a disaster area to areas unaffected by the disaster
 Definitive care of patients at hospitals in areas unaffected by the disaster.

Over 5,000 NDMS civilian medical personnel (IFEs) are organized into a number of types of teams, designed to provide medical services supporting the Federal Public Health and Medical Services (Emergency Support Function - 8) mission.

NDMS Teams
The NDMS is made up of several teams that have specific capabilities.

 Disaster Medical Assistance Team (DMAT) - provides medical care during a disaster or other incident. Fifty-five Disaster Medical Assistance Teams (DMATs), which include specialized teams to handle burns, pediatrics, crush injuries, surgery and mental health.
 Disaster Mortuary Operational Response Team (DMORT) - provides forensic analysis of human remains in order to identify victims following a disaster or major transportation incident. Eleven of these teams, which consist of private citizens with specialized training and experience to help in the recovery, identification and processing of deceased victims, including one team with WMD capabilities.
 Victim Identification Center (VIC) - conducts interviews with family members to gather ante mortem information, including DNA samples, to assist in identifying human remains.
 National Veterinary Response Team (NVRT) - provides veterinary services in a disaster area, or assessment and consultation regarding the need for veterinary services following major disasters or emergencies
 Federal Coordinating Centers (FCCs) - recruit hospitals and maintain local non-Federal hospital participation in the NDMS, conduct patient reception planning, and coordinate patient reception exercises with stakeholders in the patient reception area
 Trauma and Critical Care Team (TCCT), known as International Medical Surgical Response Team (IMSuRT) prior to 2017 - widely recognized as a specialized team, trained and equipped to establish a fully capable field surgical facility anywhere in the world.  TCCTs provide critical, surgical, and emergency care to help people in the wake of disaster or emergency.
 Incident Management Team (IMT) - Provides the field management component of the Federal public health and medical response. The IRCT provides liaisons in the field to coordinate with jurisdictional, Tribal, or State incident management and provides the field management and coordination for deployed HHS and other ESF #8 assets to integrate those assets with the State and local response.

Over 1,800 civilian hospitals in the U.S. are voluntary members of NDMS. Their role is to provide approximately 100,000 hospital beds to support NDMS operations in an emergency. When a civilian or military crisis requires the activation of the NDMS system, participating hospitals communicate their available bed types and numbers to a central control point. Patients can be distributed to a number of hospitals without overwhelming any one facility with casualties.

Operations
Under the NDMS, movement (evacuation) of patients from a disaster area is coordinated by the FCCs in each of the 10 FEMA regions. The actual transport is conducted by the Department of Defense. Patients arriving in a region are then dispersed to a local NDMS participating hospital.

In the aftermath of Hurricane Katrina in the fall of 2005, the NDMS system activated almost all of their civilian medical teams to assist victims in Texas, Louisiana, and Mississippi; helped evacuate hundreds of medical patients from the affected areas; and augmented medical staffing levels at hospitals impacted by the evacuations.

Parent agencies

NDMS was originally under the U.S. Public Health Service (USPHS) within The Department of Health and Human Services (HHS). In 2003, as a direct result of the September 11 attacks in 2001 the newly formed Department of Homeland Security (DHS), requested, and was granted convening authority over NDMS which was then placed under the direction of the Federal Emergency Management Agency (FEMA).

After Hurricane Katrina, amidst allegations of mismanagement (etc.), NDMS was reorganized under HHS, as legislated by an Act of Congress entitled, "the Pandemic and All-Hazards Preparedness Act (PAHPA)", (Public Law 109-417), effective January 1, 2007.

This positioned NDMS, organizationally, within the Assistant Secretary for Preparedness and Response (ASPR) Office of Preparedness and Emergency Operations (OPEO).  In 2012, OPEO was reorganized and renamed the Office of Emergency Management (OEM).

ASPR OEM is responsible for developing operational plans, analytical products, and training exercises to ensure the preparedness of the Office, the Department, the Federal Government and the public to respond to domestic and international public health and medical threats and emergencies. OEM is also responsible for ensuring that ASPR has the systems, logistical support, and procedures necessary to coordinate the Department's operational response to acts of terrorism and other public health and medical threats and emergencies. OEM maintains a regional planning and response coordination capability, and has operational responsibility for HHS functions related to the National Disaster Medical Systems (NDMS).  This responsibility is carried out by the Division of National Disaster Medical System in OEM.

OEM acts as the primary operational liaison to emergency response entities within HHS:
the U.S. Food and Drug Administration (FDA),
Health Resources and Services Administration (HRSA),
Substance Abuse and Mental Health Services Administration (SAMHSA),
Centers for Disease Control and Prevention (CDC),
Centers for Medicare and Medicaid Services (CMS), and
Administration for Children and Families (ACF)

OEM also acts as the primary operational liaison to emergency response entities outside HHS:

United States Department of Agriculture (USDA),
United States Department of Veterans Affairs (USDVA),
United States Department of Defense(USDOD),
Federal Emergency Management Agency(FEMA),
and the public.

References

Other sources
Knouss RF, "National Disaster Medical System", Public Health Rep, 2001;116(suppl 2):49–52.

External links
 
 
 OH-1 Disaster Medical Assistance Team - Toledo, Ohio
 RI-1 Disaster Medical Assistance Team - Rhode Island
 CA-11 Disaster Medical Assistance Team - Sacramento, California
 CA-6 Disaster Medical Assistance Team - San Francisco Bay Area, California

Disaster preparedness in the United States
Federal Emergency Management Agency
Administration for Strategic Preparedness and Response